ŽKK Croatia was a Croatian women's basketball club from Zagreb. Today is called ŽKK Croatia 2006 although the all management and composition changed.

Honours
National Championships – 5

 Croatian Women's Basketball League:
Winners (5): 1995, 1996, 1998, 2001, 2005
Runners-up (2): 1994, 1997

National Cups – 6

Ružica Meglaj-Rimac Cup:
Winners (6): 1995, 1997, 1998, 1999, 2000, 2001
Runners-up (3): 1996, 2004, 2005

FIBA cup - Final four Napoli, Italy, 2005.

External links
Official website
Official page at facebook.com
Profile at eurobasket.com

Croatia 2006 Zagreb
Sports teams in Zagreb
Basketball teams established in 1974
Women's basketball teams in Yugoslavia